KABA may refer to:

 Kaba Group, locks and security company
 KABA (FM), a radio station (90.3 FM) licensed to serve Louise, Texas, United States
 KNIK-LP, a low-power television station (channel 6) licensed to serve Anchorage, Alaska, United States, which held the call sign KABA-LP from June to September 2009
 KVNT, a radio station (1020 AM) licensed to serve Eagle River, Alaska, which held the call sign KABA from March 2008 to June 2009
 KABA (Radio personality)